Carlos Eduardo Meléndez Rosales (born 8 December 1997) is a Honduran professional footballer who plays as a defender for F.C. Motagua in the Honduran Liga Nacional and the Honduras national team.

Club career 
Meléndez made his professional debut with Vida in a 0–0 Liga Nacional tie with C.D. Marathón on 28 July 2018.

International career
He represented Honduras at the 2020 Olympics.

He made his debut for Honduras national football team on 12 November 2021 in a World Cup qualifier against Panama.

Personal life
Carlos' brother, Denis Meléndez, is also a professional footballer.

References

External links
 

1997 births
Living people
People from La Ceiba
Honduran footballers
Honduras international footballers
Association football defenders
C.D.S. Vida players
F.C. Motagua players
Liga Nacional de Fútbol Profesional de Honduras players
Footballers at the 2020 Summer Olympics
Olympic footballers of Honduras